Nick Hebeler (born July 18, 1957) is a former professional Canadian football defensive lineman who played nine years in the Canadian Football League, for the BC Lions from 1979 to 1985 and the Saskatchewan Roughriders in 1986 and 1987.

Hebeler played 86 games for the B.C. Lions and recorded 68.5 sacks during that time. He was a part of the 1985 Lions' Grey Cup championship team.
Hebeler was voted a member of both the 25 and 50 year anniversary B.C. Lions dream teams, celebrating the top players in the history of the franchise.

Hebeler played college football at Simon Fraser University.

After his retirement he became a building contractor and now runs a program for autistic youth and mentally challenged individuals. He lives with his wife, their twins and his son.

References

1957 births
Living people
BC Lions players
Canadian football defensive linemen
Players of Canadian football from British Columbia
Saskatchewan Roughriders players
Simon Fraser Clan football players
Canadian football people from Vancouver